MidWest Radio is a radio station based in County Mayo, Ireland. Officially opened in 1989 (having operated previously as an unlicensed station), its current studios are located on Clare Street, Ballyhaunis. The JNLR/MRBI radio listenership survey released in February 2020 shows that Midwest Radio has the second highest listenership rates in the country and the highest of any local radio station, with a market-share of 60% of its catchment area.

History
When Midwest Radio first began broadcasting in 1989 its studios were located on Abbey Street, Ballyhaunis, County Mayo. Its franchise area is county Mayo although it can be received in various parts of Connacht. Paul Claffey is the Managing Director of the company. Chris Carroll is the head of sales and Tommy Marren is the Station Manager. Its target audience is 40+. Over its twenty years on air the station's schedule hasn't changed dramatically with many of the original presenters still working for the company. The station celebrated its 20th year on air in 2009. To celebrate its 20th birthday the station released a compilation CD of its most requested songs. The radio station is podcasting many of its programmes and segments.

Midwest Radio launched an online only radio station - Midwest Irish Radio - in 2005. This has a separate schedule to Midwest Radio, although The Mid Morning Show does broadcast on Midwest Irish Radio. The majority of its schedule consists of non-stop Irish music. Its sister station NorthWest Radio shut down in 2004 having lost its broadcasting licence and was replaced by Ocean FM.

Shows
The station is on air 24 hours a day. Between 1am and 7am an automated service is run, like most Irish radio stations. This automated service consists of "Rewind" which is a repeat of The Tommy Marren Show and The Mid Morning Show followed by back to back music. Regular programming beings every day at 7am, with the exception of Sunday, and finishes most nights at 1am. Like many local radio stations in Ireland, it mainly broadcasts country music and classic hits. Some of the station's programmes do contain current chart music such as The Breakfast Show, The Late Late Lunchbox, Classic Express and Friday night's ''Hot Hits hour""

References

External links
 Official website

Adult contemporary radio stations in Ireland
Country radio stations in Ireland
Former pirate radio stations
Pirate radio stations in Ireland
News and talk radio stations in Ireland
Radio stations in the Republic of Ireland
Radio stations established in 1989